Decibel is an independent record label based in Milwaukee, Wisconsin founded in 1994. It debuted with the industrial music album Abduction by Alien Faktor released the same year.

History
The Milwaukee based Decibel was founded in 1994 by composer Tom Muschitz. The label was initially established to release the debut album by Muschitz's project Alien Faktor, but soon after focused on issuing records by artists who were influenced by industrial informed electronic music. It served as an outlet for musical acts such as Morpheus Sister and Oneiroid Psychosis. The label's final release was Luciferin by Machine That Flashes in 1998.

Discography

References

External links

American independent record labels
Industrial record labels
Record labels established in 1994
Record labels disestablished in 1998
Companies based in Milwaukee